The 2023 Rafael Nadal tennis season officially began on 29 December 2022, with the start of the 2023 United Cup.

Yearly summary

Early hard court season

United Cup

Australian Open

Rafael Nadal was the defending champion.  He defeated Jack Draper in 4 sets in the opening round with Draper suffering cramps in the later stages of the match.   Nadal was defeated by Mackenzie McDonald in the second round in straight sets with Nadal suffering a hip injury to the ileopsoas muscle in his left leg during the match.

Indian Wells Masters

Rafael Nadal withdrew from the tournament due to a left leg injury. As a result, he dropped out of the top 10 in the ATP rankings for the first time since his top 10 debut in 2005, ending a record streak of 912 weeks.

Clay court season

Monte-Carlo Masters

All matches

This table chronicles all the matches of Rafael Nadal in 2023.

Singles matches

Schedule
Per Rafael Nadal, this is his current 2023 schedule (subject to change).

Singles schedule

Yearly records

Head-to-head matchups
Rafael Nadal has a  ATP match win–loss record in the 2023 season. Bold indicates player was ranked top 10 at the time of at least one meeting. The following list is ordered by number of wins:

  Jack Draper 1–0
  Mackenzie McDonald 0–1
  Alex de Minaur 0–1
  Cameron Norrie 0–1

* Statistics correct .

Earnings
Bold font denotes tournament win

 Figures in United States dollars (USD) unless noted. 
source：2023 Singles Activity
source：2023 Doubles Activity

See also

 2023 ATP Tour
 2023 Novak Djokovic tennis season
 2023 Daniil Medvedev tennis season
 2023 Carlos Alcaraz tennis season

Notes

References

External links 
  
 ATP tour profile

2023 in Spanish sport
Rafael Nadal tennis seasons
Nadal
Nadal